The 10th Parliament of Tanzania was the legislature of Tanzania following the 2010 general election of Members of Parliament (MPs) to the unicameral National Assembly.

Graphical representation
The National Assembly has a total of 357 seats. This includes the 239 directly contested parliamentary constituencies.

List of MPs elected in the general election

Changes
2011: Rostam Aziz (CCM, Igunga) resigned on 13 July 2011 citing his exit from "gutter politics" and his decision to 'concentrate on his business'. On 2 October 2011, Dalaly Kafumu (CCM) won the by-election by 50.45%.
2012: Jeremiah Sumari (CCM, Arumeru East) died on 19 January 2012. On 2 April 2012, Joshua Nassari (CHADEMA) won the by-election by 54.92%.
2013: Salim Khamis (CUF, Chambani) died on 28 March 2013. On 16 June 2013, Yussuf Salim Hussein (CUF) won the by-election by a landslide (83.6%)
2014: William Mgimwa (CCM, Kalenga) died on 1 January 2014 whilst undergoing treatment in South Africa. A by-election took place on 16 March 2014 and his son Godfrey Mgimwa (CCM) won by a landslide (79.27%).
2014: Saidi Bwanamdogo (CCM, Chalinze) died on 22 January 2014. A by-election took place on 6 April 2014 and Ridhiwani Kikwete (CCM) won by a landslide (86.44%).
2015: John Komba (CCM, Mbinga West) died on 28 February 2015. Prime Minister Mizengo Pinda said that no by-election will be held as per the 1985 Elections Act; due to the short time left before the next election.
2015: Zitto Kabwe (Chadema, Kigoma North) was expelled from his party, thus, ending his tenure.
2015: Eugen Mwaiposa (CCM, Ukonga) died on 2 June 2015.
2015: Donald Max (CCM, Geita) died on 23 June 2015.

References

External links
 National Electoral Commission website

 
 
MP